Hypertrophic cardiomyopathy screening is an assessment and testing to detect hypertrophic cardiomyopathy (HCM).

It is a way of identifying HCM in immediate relatives of family members diagnosed with HCM, and athletes as part of a sports medical. It aims to detect HCM early, so that interventions can be commenced to prevent complications and sudden cardiac death.



Purpose 

HCM is a heart disease in which a portion of the heart becomes thickened without an obvious cause. It affects up to one in 200 people and runs in families. A significant number of people with the condition have no symptoms. Screening is a way of identifying HCM in immediate relatives of family members diagnosed with hypertrophic cardiomyopathy (HCM), and athletes as part of a sports medical. Additional tests may also be performed in those who faint or have exertional chest pain. It aims to detect HCM early, so that interventions can be commenced to prevent complications and sudden cardiac death.

Screening 
Generally, screening may be considered for anyone of any age with a family history of HCM or sudden death. Screening includes at first a history of symptoms or family member with HCM, and a physical examination which may reveal a heart murmur or fourth heart sound. Initial tests include an ECG and 24-hour ambulatory ECG. Other tests include echocardiogram, genetic testing and cardiac MRI. 

The American Heart Association have developed a 14-point evaluation for competitive athletes, which it recommends for screening healthy teenagers and young adults.

Pre-participation Screening

In a few well-trained athletes, the normal 10% to 20% increase in left ventricular wall thickness may make it less easy to differentiate an athletic heart from HCM. In HCM, the 12-lead ECG typically shows T wave inversion, ST depression and prominent Q waves, unlike the isolated LVH signs of a normal athletic heart. The ventricular cavity in athletes may also be 10% to 15% greater than in comparable non-athletes.

Particularly for black athletes, some of their ECG characteristics are more likely to cross over with those seen in HCM. If interpreted incorrectly, it has the possibility of leading to being wrongly reassured or even incorrectly diagnosed with HCM leading to being unfairly disqualified. Limited studies mean it is unclear what structural adaptations occur in the hearts of other ethnicities. Limited literature on screening Arab and African male athletes shows a high false positive rate; that is the tests indicate they have the disease when they don't.

Global variation
HCM has traditionally been of greater interest in Europe, North America, Japan, Israel, and Australia.

Research directions
As of 2020, research on heart adaptations in females, teenagers and Asian populations is required.

References 

Cardiomyopathy
Cardiogenetic disorders
Medical tests